Dark Rainbow  is an Indian Bollywood film directed by Abhik Bhanu, starring Sara Khan and Mayur Mehta. It was scheduled to be released in mid-2013.

Abhik Bhanu, who previously directed the feature film Sab Kuch Hai Kuch Bhi Nahin, is the author of Dark Rainbow.

Its official launch was on 15 December 2011 with Ekta Kapoor in attendance.

Synopsis
Dark Rainbow is a musical love story. The central character Ruhi (played by Sara Khan) is in love with a talented musician, Ranbir (Mayur Mehta). Rann has a band called Rainbow.

Cast 
Mayur Mehta ... Ranbeer
Sara Khan ... Ruhi
Vikas Pahwa ... Joy
Aditya Vikram ... Aditya
Bosky Sheth ... Bosky
Kritika Sharma ... Wendy
Vaibhav Singhvi ... Rehman
Masroor S ... Manoj 
Zainab K ... Koyal 
Pramod Muthu ... Ruhi's father

Soundtrack 
The music is composed by music director Manoj Jain. He is making his Bollywood debut through this film. He composed seven tracks, ranging from pure classical to blues rock to soft romantic numbers. They will be available to the audience after the official music launch.

References

Unreleased Hindi-language films
Indian romance films